Cassine may refer to:

 Cassine, Piedmont, town and commune of the Province of Alessandria in the Italian region Piedmont
 Cassine (plant), genus of trees, of the plant family Celastraceae

See also 

 Casine (disambiguation)
 Cassino (disambiguation)